County routes in Clinton County, New York, were not signed in any form, until 2015 when it began adding the blue pentagon route shields, serving as little more than references for inventory purposes. CR 45–56 served as spurs to the county's recycling facilities.

Routes 1–30

Routes 31 and up

See also

County routes in New York

References